Viola Hildegard Gråsten (born Viola Hildegard Forsberg) (18 November 1910 – 20 October 1994) was a Swedish textile designer.

Gråsten was born in Keuruu in Häme, Finland and was brought up as a foster daughter by the Finnish Finance Minister, Ernst Gråsten. She studied for four years at the Central School of Crafts in Helsinki until 1936, after which she worked as a designer at the Friends of Finnish Handicraft. In 1944, because of wartime yarn shortages in Finland, she moved to Sweden and designed shaggy rugs for Textiles & Interiors in Stockholm. A year later she took a post at the NK Textile Studio, where she began to design patterns for textiles and made a reputation for her colourful geometric designs. In 1956 she became artistic director of fashion textiles at Mölnlycke Weavers, where she stayed until her retirement in 1973.

Gråsten was awarded the Prince Eugen Medal for design in 1973.

Gallery

References

Further reading

External links
 Works in the Design Arkivet database (in Swedish)

1910 births
1994 deaths
20th-century Swedish women artists
20th-century Swedish artists
20th-century Finnish women artists
20th-century women textile artists
20th-century textile artists
Swedish weavers
Textile designers
Recipients of the Prince Eugen Medal
Finnish emigrants to Sweden